The First relation letter from Pedro de Valdivia to emperor Charles V is one of the six Letters of relation written by Pedro de Valdivia to Charles V, Holy Roman Emperor by his name in the Holy Roman Empire in which he relates his journey to Chile and the conquest of that land. This first letter was dated on 20 August 1545, the late winter of the southern hemisphere. It differs from other letters sent from conquistadores to Charles V by emphasizing the difficulties, called "trabajos", literally "works" in the letter, of conquest.

References 

Letters (message)
Chilean documents
La Serena, Chile
Conquistadors
1545 documents
Charles V, Holy Roman Emperor